August Weenaas (1835–1924) was a Norwegian American Lutheran minister and educator. August Weenaas was the founding President of Augsburg  University.

Biography
August Weenaas was born in Norway and educated in the ministry at the University of Christiania. He was ordained as a minister in the Church of Norway. He served as a pastor there for several years at Loppen prior to immigrating to the United States in 1868.  Weenaas  resigned his pastorate in the beginning of February 1868.  Weenaas became a professor in Paxton, Illinois at the Scandinavian Augustana Synod Seminary (now Augustana College) in Rock Island, Illinois. In 1869, August Weenaas was named president of Augsburg Seminary. August Weenaas was Augsburg’s president from 1869 until 1876.  Weenaas recruited two professors from Norway, Sven Oftedal and Georg Sverdrup. Together these three men would serve as the first three presidents of Augsburg Seminary covering  the period 1868 through 1911.

Weenaas took active part in the movement which resulted in the friendly separation of the Norwegians from the Scandinavian Augustana Synod, at the meeting held at Andover, Illinois, in June 1870. He was one of the organizers of the Conference of the Norwegian-Danish Evangelical Lutheran Church of America at the following meeting held at St. Ansgar, Iowa in August of the same year. From January 1870 until June 1876 he edited the official paper of the Conference called Lutheraneren og Missionsbladet.

His wife, Valborg died in September 1873 and subsequently his two young daughters also died. In 1876, Weenaas returned to Norway.  In 1882, he returned to the United States with his second wife, Marie and several of their children. The family lived in Red Wing, Minnesota where Weenaas taught theology at the Red Wing Seminary from 1882 to 1885 before returning to Norway, where he engaged in pastoral work. Upon his return to Norway he received appointment as pastor at Søndmøre in Ålesund, More og Romsdal.

Selected works
Wisconsinismen; belyst ved historiske Kjendsgjerninger (1875)
Falskt vidnesbyrd (1879)
Mindeblade: eller Otte Aar in Amerika (1890)

References

Other sources
Hamre, James S. August Weenaas: A Seminary President among Norwegian Immigrants Interprets the Nineteenth Century American Lutheran Scene (Lutheran Historical Conference, Bibliography of Writings on Lutheranism in America, Essays and Reports, Vol. 17, 1996)

External links
August Weenaas House, Marshall WI.
Faculty at Augsburg Seminary

1835 births
1924 deaths
American Lutheran theologians
19th-century American Lutheran clergy
Norwegian emigrants to the United States
19th-century Norwegian Lutheran clergy
20th-century Norwegian Lutheran clergy